Under may refer to:

"Under" (Alex Hepburn song), 2013
"Under" (Pleasure P song), 2009
Bülent Ünder (born 1949), Turkish footballer
Cengiz Ünder (born 1997), Turkish footballer
Marie Under (1883–1980), Estonian poet
 Under (restaurant), underwater Norwegian restaurant